Mustafa Hajrulahović "Talijan" (22 January 1957 – 8 March 1998) was a Bosnian military officer and later a general of the Army of the Republic of Bosnia and Herzegovina, in charge of the defence of Sarajevo. 

He graduated from the military academy in Split, Croatia in 1979. In 1991, he left the JNA with the rank of Captain and deserted to the Army of the Republic of Bosnia and Herzegovina. For most of the war, he was the commander of the 1st Corps, but at the end of the war, he was placed in the war Presidency of Bosnia and Herzegovina. He was very popular in the army and with the people. He was one of the key people in the defense of Sarajevo during the Bosnian War, in a city besieged and helpless amid a relentless onslaught of artillery and sniper fire.

Hajrulahović died of a heart attack when he was visiting his mother in Hamburg, Germany. He was buried in a specially marked grave near Ali Pasha Mosque in Sarajevo.

References

External links 
 Mustafa Hajrulahović 'TALIJAN' BOSANAC A TALIJAN I DIO
 Mustafa Hajrulahovic, 41, Bosnian General - The New York Times

1957 births
1998 deaths
People from Banja Luka
Bosniaks of Bosnia and Herzegovina
Bosnia and Herzegovina Muslims
Bosnia and Herzegovina generals
Officers of the Yugoslav People's Army